Nalini Singh is a New Zealand author of Indo-Fijian descent. She has authored numerous paranormal romance novels.

Early life 

Of Indian descent, Nalini Singh was born in 1977 in Suva, Fiji, and moved to Auckland, New Zealand when she was 10. She attended Mount Roskill Grammar School, then studied Law and English Literature at the University of Auckland, where she graduated LLB (conjoint) with honours in 2001.

Writing 

In 1999, Singh placed third in the Romance Writers of New Zealand's Clendon Award competition. Then in 2001 her manuscript "Coaxing the Sheik" won the Jane Porter Award for highest-placed Mills and Boon, as well as the Clendon Award's Readers' Choice Award that year. "Coaxing the Sheik" went on to be her first published work, published under the title Desert Warrior through the imprint Silhouette Desire in 2003.

Her books have appeared on the New York Times best-sellers list, the USA Today best-sellers list, and the Publishers Weekly best-sellers list. 

She has won several other awards including the Sir Julius Vogel Award for best novella/novelette (twice, in 2008 and 2009). Alpha Night won the Favourite Paranormal Romance at the 2020 Australian Romance Readers Awards. Her 2021 crime novel, Quiet in Her Bones, was a finalist for the Best Crime Novel at the 2022 Ngaio Marsh Awards.

Bibliography

Singh has had over two dozen novels published,. She has also self-published several short stories.

Psy-Changeling series

Initial series

Trinity series

Short stories 
These short stories were made available on Singh's own website, or in her "Newsletter Exclusives" e-book.

Deleted Scenes

Guild Hunter series

Novels

Short stories
These short stories were made available on Singh's own website, or in her "Newsletter Exclusives" e-book.

Deleted Scenes

Rock Kiss series

Novels

Short stories
Available in Newsletter Exclusives: Volume 1

Music Awards (Molly, Fox, others)
David's Memo to Thea (Thea, David)
Thea's Reply (David, Thea)
With This Memo (the main characters)
Sunshine (the main characters)

Hard Play series

Royal House of Shadows 
A series of 4 books each by a different author

Other books

Standalone
A Madness of Sunshine (December 2019) 
Quiet in Her Bones (Feb 2021)

Silhouette Desire

Short stories

 Star Kissed - free short story - about the Keepers - available on Nalini's website or Newsletter Exclusives: Volume 1

Anthologies and collections

Other work 

Nalini Singh spent three years working in Japan as an English teacher and touring other parts of Asia. At other times she has also worked as a lawyer, a librarian, a candy factory general hand, and a bank temp, but "not necessarily in that order".

References

External links 
 Nalini Singh's personal web site
 NZ Herald best-sellers list
 NY Times best-sellers list (12 November 2010)
 Sir Julius Vogels award winners official list 2008 & 2009
 BookAwards list of SJV award winners
 Scoop report on SJV winners
 PublishMe report on SJV winners
 Women on Writing
 The Clendon Award is administered by the Romance Writers of New Zealand Incorporated

Living people
New Zealand women novelists
New Zealand romantic fiction writers
1977 births
People educated at Mount Roskill Grammar School
21st-century New Zealand novelists
Women romantic fiction writers
21st-century New Zealand women writers